Kobyzhcha is a village in Nizhyn Raion (district) of Chernihiv Oblast (province) in northern Ukraine. It belongs to Bobrovytsia urban hromada, one of the hromadas of Ukraine.  The village is located on the Trubizh River, a left tributary of the Dnipro.

Kobyzhcha was first founded in 1100. It is located near the Kobyzhcha Railroad Station, the second railroad station in the entire district.

Until 18 July 2020, Kobyzhcha belonged to Bobrovytsia Raion. The raion was abolished in July 2020 as part of the administrative reform of Ukraine, which reduced the number of raions of Chernihiv Oblast to five. The area of Bobrovytsia Raion was merged into Nizhyn Raion.

References

External links
 
 kobizhcha.at.ua – Unofficial website of the village Kobyzhcha of Ukraine, generated in 2008.
 Verkhovna Rada website – s. Kobyzhcha Chernihivska oblast, Bobrovytskyi raion
 The murder of the Jews of Kobyzhcha during World War II, at Yad Vashem website.

]
Holocaust locations in Ukraine
Kozeletsky Uyezd
Villages in Nizhyn Raion